Hoquei Club Palau de Plegamans is a Spanish rink hockey club from Palau-solità i Plegamans, Catalonia, established in 1975, mainly known by its women's team, that plays the OK Liga Femenina.

History
Founded in 1975, the women's team promoted to the top tier in 2011, by winning the second division. Only years later, in 2015, the club achieved their first league ever and repeated success in 2019, after beating CP Manlleu after a do-or-die match in the last round.

Season to season

Trophies
OK Liga Femenina: 2
2015, 2019

References

External links
Official website

Sports clubs established in 1975
Catalan rink hockey clubs
Sports clubs in Barcelona